Grace Greenwood may refer to:

 "Grace Greenwood", pseudonym of Sara Jane Lippincott (1823-1904), American writer
 Grace Greenwood Ames (1905–1979), American artist